The 2011 Irish Greyhound Derby took place during August and September with the final being held at Shelbourne Park in Dublin on 10 September 2011.

The winner Razldazl George won €120,000 and was trained by Dolores Ruth, owned by the Dazzling Syndicate and bred by Dolores Ruth. The race was sponsored by the Ladbrokes.

Final result 
At Shelbourne, 10 September (over 550 yards):

Distances 
short-head, 3, 4½, neck, ¾ (lengths)

Competition Report
The 2010 Irish Greyhound Derby champion Tyrur McGuigan returned to defend his title and was a first round winner. The fastest round one winner was Razldazl George in 29.38. In round two Razldazl George went fastest again 29.54 and in the third round Tyrur McGuigan won his third consecutive race in 29.83 as did Razldazl George and Razldazl Bugatti. 2010 finalist Barefoot Bullet failed to get to round three and the only British challenge came to end when Nick Savva's greyhounds were eliminated. 

There were shocks in the quarter finals starting with defending champion Tyrur McGuigan who finished last in his heat after finishing lame and was retired to stud. Makeshift, Razldazl Jayfkay, Melodys Royal and Tyrur Big Mike all failed to make the semi-finals. Heat winners were Dream Walker, Croom Star, Rockchase Bullet and Krug Ninety Five.

Rockchase Bullet claimed the first semi-final from Razldazl George and Rockview Head in 29.67 whilst Razldazl Bugatti beat veteran campaigner Krug Ninety Five and Dream Walker in the second semi recording 29.99.

In the final Razldazl Bugatti moved off and bumped Rockchase Bullet when both were well placed. This left Razldazl George to take up the running and hold off a late challenge from Dream Walker.

Quarter finals

Semi finals

See also
2011 UK & Ireland Greyhound Racing Year

References

Greyhound Derby
Irish Greyhound Derby
Irish Greyhound Derby
Irish Greyhound Derby, 2011